Events from the year 1591 in Sweden

Incumbents
 Monarch – John III

Events

Births

 - Beata Oxenstierna, courtier (died 1652) 
 - Bengt Oxenstierna (governor), diplomat (died 1643)

Deaths

 
 

 January 1 - Andreas Laurentii Björnram, Archbishop of Uppsala (born 1520)

References

 
Years of the 16th century in Sweden
Sweden